Aradhana  is a 1962 Indian Telugu-language romance film produced by V. B. Rajendra Prasad and D. Ranga Rao, and directed by V. Madhusudhana Rao. The film stars Akkineni Nageswara Rao and Savitri, with music composed by S. Rajeswara Rao. It is a remake of the Bengali film Sagarika (1956). The film was released on 16 February 1962, and emerged a box office success.

Plot 
Muralikrishna an introvert, aspires to study abroad as a last wish of his mother. Appreciating his dedication, the medical college principal V. R. Rao approves the scholarship. During that time, Murali loves another medical student Anuradha who envies another student Sarala. So, she writes a love letter to Anuradha in the name of Murali which makes her furious and complains to Rao, as a result, Murali loses his scholarship. Humiliated, Murali gets back to the village, despite his father Gopalam deciding to send Murali abroad. So, he approaches a crafty wealthy person in their village Lingaiah who grants the amount on the condition to couple up his daughter Lakshmi with Murali. Helpless Gopalam accepts the deal and Murali leaves. Thereafter, Dr. Saradhi the close friend of Murali chides Anuradha even though Sarala repents and admits her mistake. Right now, Anuradha starts loving Murali when the wheel of fortune makes Lingaiah her paternal uncle, he announces the marriage proposal and requests Anuradha to educate and transform Lakshmi into fashionable. Knowing it, Anuradha collapses but withstands and moves forward with her entrusted responsibility.

Meanwhile, Gopalam apprises Murali regarding the promise given to Lingaiah and asks him to communicate with Lakshmi at Anuradha's address. In the city, Lakshmi falls for her cousin Yoganandam, becomes carefree, and does not show any interest in Murali. At present, Anuradha writes replies to Murali on behalf of Lakshmi and both of them close in. Murali loses his eyesight in an accident when Lingaiah drops the match and everyone quits Murali. After return, Anuradha serves him out of adoration by purporting herself as Lakshmi. After some time, Rao and Saradhi plan surgery to regain Murali's eyesight. Meanwhile, Lakshmi realises the love affair of Murali and Anuradha, so, she accuses and elopes with Yoganandam but Lingaiah forcibly brings her back. Soon after the surgery, Anuradha disappears replacing Lakshmi but Murali recognises and perturbs to see Lakshmi that served him which leads to loss of recouped sight. Here Lingaiah and Saradhi convince and get back despite when Murali becomes normal and learns the truth. The film ends with the marriages of Murali and Anuradha, and Yoganandam and Lakshmi.

Cast 
Akkineni Nageswara Rao as Muralikrishna
Savitri as Anuradha
Jaggayya as Saradhi
Gummadi as V. R. Rao
Relangi as Yoganandam
Ramana Reddy as Lingaiah
Dr. Sivaramakrishnaiah as Bondam
Rajasree as Sarala
Girija as Lakshmi
 L. Vijayalakshmi (special appearance in the song "Emanta Emanta")

Production 
Aradhana is a remake of the Bengali film Sagarika (1956). The song "Ohoho Mamayya" was planned to be filmed at Madras Zoo, but as the location was not found to be visually appealing due to continuous smoke emerging from coal engines there, the song was instead filmed at Mysore Zoo. While the film was predominantly in black-and-white, this song alone was filmed in colour.

Soundtrack 
The music was composed by S. Rajeswara Rao. The song "Na Hrudayamlo Nidurinche Cheli" is based on "Amar Shopne Dekha Rajkkonna Thaake" from the original Bengali film.

Release 
Aradhana was released on 16 February 1962 and emerged a box office success, running for over 100 days in theatres.

References

Bibliography

External links 
 

1960s romance films
1960s Telugu-language films
1962 films
Films directed by V. Madhusudhana Rao
Films scored by S. Rajeswara Rao
Indian romance films
Telugu remakes of Bengali films